The Yugo class submarine is a class of four midget submarines used primarily for infiltration and espionage by North Korea. The Yugo class was given its name because it was built to plans supplied to North Korea by Yugoslavia in 1965.

Design 
The Yugo class is a family of midget submarines that are not all identical. The displacement is either the standard 90 tons of the original Yugoslavian design for the early units or 110 tons for the later units. Armament is either a pair of 400 mm torpedo tubes (early units) or a pair of 21 in (533mm) short torpedo tubes (later units).

History 
The final vessel was built in the 1980s, after which they were superseded by the Sang-O-class submarines. On June 12, 1998, one out of six submarines was captured by the South Koreans.

In the early 2000s, Vietnam "gained experience" with these craft prior to ordering Russian Kilo-class diesel-electric submarines for denial of area capabilities, specifically against China's fleet per the Foreign Policy Research Institute.

In March 2016, it was announced that the North Korean Navy had lost one of the ships during exercises.

Operators

 
 : Purchased in 1997. These were used by Vietnam People's Navy for swimmer delivery operations aside from conventional submarine operations. The purchase was done by bartering. Kim Jong-il personally approved of the delivery to make amends for not paying Vietnam for purchasing 20,000 tons of rice.
 : Classified as a 'Delfin-class submarine' and is rumored to have either been built in North Korea or locally assembled in Cuba with North Korean assistance.

References

See also 
 Una-class submarine, Yugoslav midget submarines

Submarines of the Korean People's Navy
Midget submarines